Marsland may refer to:

People
Adam Marsland, American musician
Edward Marsland (1923–1996), British academic
Jim Marsland, Scottish footballer
Richard Marsland (1976–2008), Australian comedy writer, actor, comedian and radio personality

Places
Marsland, Nebraska, an unincorporated community
Marsland Formation, a geologic formation in Nebraska
Marsland Valley, a nature reserve at the Cornwall-Devon border, England

Ships
, a number of ships with this name

Airlines
Marsland Aviation, an airline based in Khartoum, Sudan